Cenolophium is a genus of flowering plants in the carrot family Apiaceae (Umbelliferae). Its only species is Cenolophium denudatum (known as Baltic parsley), native to Europe and Asia. The stems are sometimes purple in colour. The flowers are attractive to numerous insects.

In cultivation in the UK, this plant has gained the Royal Horticultural Society’s Award of Garden Merit (confirmed 2017).

References 

 Cenolophium denudatum in Flora Europaea
 Cenolophium denudatum in eFloras

Gallery

Apioideae
Monotypic Apioideae genera